Encore Enterprises, Inc. is a company that invests in real estate, including hotels, office buildings, and shopping centers in the United States of America.

History
Encore was founded in 1999 by Dr. Bharat Sangani, and Patrick J. Barber to bring multiple real estate entities created by Dr. Sangani under one umbrella holding company.

References

Real estate companies of the United States
Companies based in Dallas
Real estate companies established in 1999
1999 establishments in Texas